The Italian Orienteering Federation is the national orienteering federation of Italy.  It is a full member of the International Orienteering Federation.

History
The Italian Orienteering Federation was founded in 1978, and joined the International Orienteering Federation in 1979. Italy participated in the World Orienteering Championships for the first time in 1981. The 2014 World Championships in foot orienteering were held in the districts of Asiago and Lavarone, Italy.

See also 
 Italian orienteers

References

External links 
 

International Orienteering Federation members
Ori
Orienteering in Italy